Dimitrios Konstas is a Greek former water polo player who competed in the 1972 Summer Olympics.

See also
 Greece men's Olympic water polo team records and statistics
 List of men's Olympic water polo tournament goalkeepers

References

External links
 

Year of birth missing (living people)
Possibly living people
Greek male water polo players
Water polo goalkeepers
Olympic water polo players of Greece
Olympiacos Water Polo Club players
Water polo players at the 1972 Summer Olympics
Ethnikos Piraeus Water Polo Club players